Sex and Blood in the Trail of the Treasure   is a 1972 Brazilian exploitation/adventure film directed by José Mojica Marins. Marins is also known by his alter ego Zé do Caixão (in English, Coffin Joe).

Producer Nélson Teixeira Mendes recruited Marins to make a low budget adventure film with a likely high financial return. The director used surplus segments of Glauco Mirko Laurelli's 1966 film Bloody Inheritance.

Plot
A gang of criminals organizes an expedition to the Amazonian forests in search of a lost treasure from a downed airplane. The members of the expedition enter into conflict because of gold and women, some committing suicide and others murdering the others.

Cast
In alphabetical order
Alfredo Almeida		
Antônio Andrade		
Big Boy		
Andreia Bryan		
Marlene Caminhoto		
Eurípedes da Silva (as Eurípides Silva)
José Galã		
Djalma Leite
Faria Magalhães				

José Mojica Marins		
Índio Paraguaio		
Roque Rodrigues		
Frederico Scarlatti		
Ailton Vaz

References

External links 
Official film site 

Sexo E Sangue na Trilha do Tesouro on Portal Heco de Cinema 

1970s adventure films
1972 films
Brazilian adventure films
Films directed by José Mojica Marins
1970s Portuguese-language films